The 2000 Japanese Formula 3 Championship was the 22nd edition of the Japanese Formula 3 Championship. It began on 26 March at Suzuka and ended on 5 November at the same place. French driver Sébastien Philippe took the championship title, winning three from ten races.

Teams and drivers
 All teams were Japanese-registered. All cars were powered by Bridgestone tyres.

Notes

Race calendar and results

Standings
Points are awarded as follows:

References

External links
 Official Site 

Formula Three
Japanese Formula 3 Championship seasons
Japan
Japanese Formula 3 Championship